Wakanui is a locality in the Ashburton District, New Zealand. The area is rural and close to the sea. Historically it is known as a grain-producing area. It holds New Zealand's largest feedlot, where Wakanui Beef is produced through intensive farming.

History
The European history of the area started with runs 139, 140, and 150 being taken up in 1854 and 1855. Wakanui is located between Ashburton and the sea, and east of the Ashburton River / Hakatere. An early owner (probably not the initial owners) was the Kermode and Moore partnership, with George Henry Moore as manager.

When Kermode and Moore sold their holdings, the land was subdivided (this process finished by 1877) and more people moved into the area. Around that time, an extensive irrigation system was implemented, which was extended across all of Ashburton County, and that opened the dry but fertile land for wheat growing. Some  of irrigation races were built throughout the county.

The Wakanui electorate was in existence for two electoral cycles and was dis-established in 1887.

In 1879, a large flour mill was erected in Wakanui. The five-storey building was a landmark for the rural location. It was deemed advisable that none of the machinery be removed and in all the building weighed an estimated . The building survived the relocation without damage.

Wakanui School
Wakanui School opened in 1876 with an initial roll of 35 pupils. In the early decades, the roll peaked in 1890 but at the fiftieth jubilee, the roll was back where it started as more schools had opened throughout the county. A full primary school (i.e. serving years 1 to 8), it had  students as of

Wakanui Beef

These days, the name Wakanui is known best for New Zealand's largest feedlot. Owned by ANZCO Foods, beef is produced here; the meat is sold under the brand name Wakanui Beef. The feedlot is consented for 19,000 cattle and it held 14,000 in 2018. While the feedlot has been in operation since 1991, it only became widely known when animal rights group SAFE published drone footage of it in 2018 and called for feedlots to be banned. Damien O'Connor, as Minister of Agriculture, weighed in on the debate in support of the feedlot. He called it "innovative" and said it was, in general, "very well managed"; he added, "the image of pastoral farming is the one New Zealand promotes and it is the mainstay of our industry".

Demographics

Winchmore-Wakanui had a population of 1,536 at the 2018 New Zealand census, an increase of 114 people (8.0%) since the 2013 census, and an increase of 252 people (19.6%) since the 2006 census. There were 579 households. There were 828 males and 711 females, giving a sex ratio of 1.16 males per female. The median age was 40.9 years (compared with 37.4 years nationally), with 315 people (20.5%) aged under 15 years, 237 (15.4%) aged 15 to 29, 729 (47.5%) aged 30 to 64, and 258 (16.8%) aged 65 or older.

Ethnicities were 86.9% European/Pākehā, 4.5% Māori, 1.4% Pacific peoples, 8.6% Asian, and 2.9% other ethnicities (totals add to more than 100% since people could identify with multiple ethnicities).

The proportion of people born overseas was 21.1%, compared with 27.1% nationally.

Although some people objected to giving their religion, 39.1% had no religion, 51.4% were Christian, 0.8% were Hindu, 0.2% were Muslim and 0.8% had other religions.

Of those at least 15 years old, 189 (15.5%) people had a bachelor or higher degree, and 249 (20.4%) people had no formal qualifications. The median income was $41,400, compared with $31,800 nationally. The employment status of those at least 15 was that 699 (57.2%) people were employed full-time, 216 (17.7%) were part-time, and 21 (1.7%) were unemployed.

References

External links

Articles containing video clips
Ashburton District
Populated places in Canterbury, New Zealand